"Make Believe Mambo" is a 1989 single by David Byrne from the album Rei Momo. The song peaked at No. 11 on the U.S. Modern Rock Tracks chart. The song features Kirsty MacColl and Willie Colón. Its music video features Byrne and two dancers in black-and-white and contains a shorter mix of the song.

Track listing 
12" release

 "Make Believe Mambo" (extended version)
 "Lie to Me"

7" release

 "Make Believe Mambo"
 "Lie to Me"

References 

1989 songs
David Byrne songs
Songs written by David Byrne